Beals is a lunar impact crater that is located near the eastern limb of the Moon, and lies across the southwestern rim of the crater Riemann. From the Earth the crater is viewed nearly from on edge, and is best seen during favorable librations. To the west is the large walled plain Gauss.

This crater formation is only lightly worn, with no significant impacts within its perimeter. The inner wall is narrower along the north-northeast face where the crater intrudes into Riemann, and the rim is somewhat irregular at the southern end. The interior floor has only a few minor ridges located near the midpoint.

Beals was formerly designated Riemann A, a satellite crater of Riemann, until the International Astronomical Union renamed it in 1982 to commemorate Carlyle S. Beals, a Canadian astronomer. Prior to the crater being designated Riemann A, this crater was known as Crater 110.

References

 
 
 
 
 
 
 
 
 
 
 
 

Impact craters on the Moon